Colonne de la liberté (French for "Column of Liberty") may refer to:
Colonne de la liberté (France)
Colonne de la liberté (Quebec)